Dennis Gratton (21 April 1934 – 18 April 2016) was an English footballer who made 51 appearances in the Football League playing for Sheffield United and Lincoln City as a centre half. He also played non-league football for Worksop Town and briefly for Boston United.

References

1934 births
2016 deaths
Footballers from Rotherham
English footballers
Association football defenders
Worksop Town F.C. players
Sheffield United F.C. players
Lincoln City F.C. players
Boston United F.C. players
English Football League players